Uganda Airlines may refer to any of the following:

 Uganda National Airlines Company, the national airline of Uganda; established in 2018 with commercial operations expected to begin in 2019.
 Uganda Airlines, defunct state-owned airline, established in 1976 and liquidated in 2001.